Franco Dori (May 7, 1943 – November 29, 1987) was an Italian professional football player. He was born in Venice and died in Mestre.

He played for 4 seasons (34 games, 7 goals) in the Serie A for S.S.C. Venezia, A.S. Roma and A.C.R. Messina.

External links
 Franco Dori's obituary 

1943 births
1987 deaths
Italian footballers
Serie A players
Venezia F.C. players
A.S. Roma players
A.C.R. Messina players
U.S. Alessandria Calcio 1912 players
Association football midfielders
Footballers from Venice